Bradley Inman ( Brad Inman) is a journalist and entrepreneur who founded several media companies. Inman's knowledge of the real estate industry dates back to his days as a syndicated real estate columnist with the San Francisco Examiner.  Inman is also the author of a novel The Right Way to Do Wrong and non-fiction books California Real Estate: the 1980s and 1990s, Real Estate Will Never be the Same and Livable Neighborhoods of the Bay Area. Inman grew up in Carlinville, Illinois and graduated from Boston University.

Companies
 Inman is co-founder of ClimateCheck, a search engine that rates climate change risk for property.
 Sold in 2021 to Beringer Capital, Inman News was founded in 1996 as an online news source for the real estate industry. Brad Inman is the founder and continues to contribute as a guest columnist and speak on real estate issues. Inman News holds annual events where Brad Inman has interviewed technology and media personalities such as Rupert Murdoch, Arianna Huffington, Craig Newmark, Barry Diller, Kara Swisher and Barbara Corcoran.
 Inman founded online real estate firm HomeGain.com in 1999, which was acquired by Classified Ventures in 2005.
 In 2005, Inman started TurnHere.com, an Internet video production and distribution platform that produced editorial and advertising content for companies such as Conde Nast, NBC, Williams Sonoma, Yelp and OpenTable. 
 Inman founded Vook, an enhanced ebook company, in early 2009 with partners including The New York Times, NBC and Simon & Schuster, and authors including Deepak Chopra, Seth Godin and Anne Rice.
 Inman was the first investor in Curbed and served as Chairman before it was sold to Vox Media.
 Inman was on the Microsoft team that launched HomeAdvisor in 1998.

Publications 

 California Real Estate: the 1980s & 1990s (February 18, 2020)
 The Right Way to Do Wrong  (January 28, 2020)
 Real Estate Will Never be the Same (July 9, 2019)
 Livable Neighborhoods of the Bay Area (March 1, 1992)

References

External links

 Inman News web site

Year of birth missing (living people)
Living people
San Francisco Examiner people
Business speakers
Boston University alumni